Robert Dunlop may refer to

Robert Dunlop (1960–2008), Northern Irish motorcycle racer
Robert Graham Dunlop (1790–1841), British naval officer and office-holder in Upper Canada
Robert Dunlop (historian) (1861–1930), English historian